Protalaridris is a genus of ant in the subfamily Myrmicinae containing the single species Protalaridris armata. The genus is known from wet forests of Ecuador and Colombia.

References

External links

Myrmicinae
Monotypic ant genera
Hymenoptera of South America